The 2019 Adamawa State House of Assembly election was held on March 9, 2019, to elect members of the Adamawa State House of Assembly in Nigeria. All the 25 seats were up for election in the Adamawa State House of Assembly.

Aminu Iya Abbas from PDP representing Uba/Gaya constituency was elected Speaker, while Pwamwakaino Mackondo from PDP representing Numan constituency was elected Deputy Speaker.

Results 
The result of the election is listed below.

Kefas Japhet from PDP won Gombi constituency
Donglok Adawa from PDP won Guyuk constituency
Aminu Iya-Abbas from PDP won Uba/Gaya constituency
Wesley Barthiya from PDP won Hong constituency
Abdullahi Ahmadu from APC won Leko/Koma constituency
Yuttisori Hamman-Tukur from PDP won Jada/Mbulo constituency
Raymond Kate from PDP won Demsa constituency
Shuaibu Babas from APC won Furore/Gurin constituency
 Abdullahi Yapak from APC won Fufore/Verre constituency
Alhassan Hamman Joda from APC won Ganye constituency
Mohammed Mutawalli Alhaji from APC won Girei constituency
Ibrahim Musa from ADC won Mayo-Belwa constituency
Kwada Joseph Ayuba from PDP won Michika constituency
Shuaibu Musa from APC won 28,271 Mubi North constituency
Musa Umar Bororo from APC won Mubi South constituency
Mackondo Pwamakeno from PDP won Numan constituency
Abubakar Isa from APC won Shelleng constituency
Simon Isa from PDP won Song constituency
Abdullahi Umar from APC won Toungo constituency
Sajo Hamidu A. from PDP won Yola North constituency
Kabiru Mijinyawa from APC won Yola South constituency
Myandasa Bauna from PDP won Lamurde constituency
Haruna Jkan Tikiri from PDP won Madagali constituency
Isa Yahaya from APC won Maiha constituency
Nashion Umar Gubi from PDP won Nasarawo/Binyeri constituency

References 

Adamawa
2019 Adamawa State elections